Wooperton railway station served the hamlet of Wooperton, Roddam, Northumberland, England from 1887 to 1954 on the Cornhill Branch.

History 
The station opened 5 September 1887 by the North Eastern Railway. It was situated immediately south of the B6346. The goods yard was situated east from the A697. The station closed to passengers on 22 September 1930 and to goods traffic on 1 December 1954. The station building and station master's house are now private residences.

References

External links 

Disused railway stations in Northumberland
Former North Eastern Railway (UK) stations
Railway stations in Great Britain opened in 1887
Railway stations in Great Britain closed in 1930
1887 establishments in England
1954 disestablishments in England